Growing Up is one of the English-language dramas in Singapore which was produced by MediaCorp, it had a total of six seasons and the show was set between the 1960s to the 1980s. The show debuted in 1996 and the final season of the show was screened in December 2001. The repeat telecast of the drama was shown in July 2009 at 3pm.

Cast and Characters
Main Cast
Lim Kay Tong as Charlie Tay Wee Kiat ( "Mr Tay")
Wee Soon Hui as Soo Mei (a.k.a. "Mrs Tay")
Andrew Seow as Gary Tay
Steven Lim as David Tay
Irin Gan as Vicky Tay
Fan Wen Qing as Tammy Tay (Season 1)
Quek Sue-Shan as Tammy Tay (Season 2)
Jamie Yeo as Tammy Tay (Season 3 to 5)

Supporting Cast
Aileen Tan as Mae Low (Married Charlie in Season 6)
Amy Cheng as Karen (Gary's wife)
Mohan as Uncle Govindasamy
Ivan Tay as Chew Keng Joo (Gary's business partner and friend)
Darren Ng as Ah Guan (David's friend)
Catherine Sng as Auntie Chong (Mrs Tay's best friend)
Anna Belle Francis (b.1978) as Jenny Lim (David's girl friend)
Cynthia Koh as Tracy Chiu (Gary's girlfriend in Season 5)
Benedict Goh as Tan Teck Ann (Vicky's husband until Season 3)
Gary Lee Wei as Timothy (Vicky's boyfriend in Season 5)
Saffri Manaf as Sulaiman (the Tays' neighbour)
Zaliha Binte Abdul Hamid as Siti (Sulaiman's wife)
Tony Castilo as Frankie (the Tays' neighbour)
Samantha Foo as Auntie Boon (the Tays' helper in Season 3)
Charlene Lim as Lily Ho (Gary's girlfriend in Season 4)
Michelle Chong as Michelle (Tammy's schoolmate in Season 3)
Sue Tan as Poh Choo (Season 6)
Marcus Mok as Jimmy Tan (Poh Choo's husband in Season 6)
Tracy Tan as Li Lien (Poh Choo's teenage daughter in Season 6)
Nick Shen as Meng (Mae's son)
David Tan as Tan Chee Keong (Poh Choo's teenage son in Season 6)
Fiona Xie as Shirley Ho
Evelyn Tan as Poh Choo (season 3)

Episodes
Season 1 Episodes
Yesterday
Walk Like A Man
Father of The Bride
Do You Want To Know a Secret
Stand By Me
Guess Who's Coming For Dinner
To Catch A Thief
The Longest Day
Don't Be Cruel
Your Cheatin' Heart
All Shook Up
We Can Work it Out
Que Sera Sera

Season 2 Episodes
The Good Old Days
Splish Splash
Escapades
Soldier Blues
For A Few Dollars More
Turn Turn Turn
Hit The Road Jack
Jailhouse Rock
Fly Away Peter Fly Away Paul
Blood Is Thicker Than Water
Crossroads
Brother Of Mine
Grandma Knows Best
Past And Present
She Said He Said They Said
Room For One More
The longest day
Forget Me Not
Cover Girl
Money Matters
The Good Son
Till Death Do Us Part
Home Is Where The Heart Is
Season 3 Episodes
Love Me Tender
Great Expectations
Count On Me
I Heard a Rumour
Custom Made Help
Mother Knows Best
The Mourning After
Life Without Mother
Close To You
Closing Ranks
First Impressions
Winning Ways
Love At First Flight
Forgiveness
The Burning Question
Light My Fire
Secrets and Lies Part 1
Secrets and Lies Part 2
Without Prejudice
The Way It Was
A Woman's Place
Affairs Of The Heart
Working Girl Woes
All In The Family
No Greater Love
All My Children
Season 4 Episodes
Yesterday Once More
The Way We Were
Family Affair
This Masquerade
Hooked On A Feeling
Sugar Baby Love
You've Got A Friend
Daddy Cool
I Will Survive
Release Me
Young Hearts Run Free
If You Leave Me Now
Both Sides Now
This Old Heart Of Mine
If I Could
You Make Me Feel Like Dancing
Goodbye Girl
You Don't Have To Be A Star
Hurting Each Other
Are You Lonesome Tonight
It Takes Two
If You Love Me Let Me Know
Do You Know Where You Are Going To?
How Deep Is Your Love
You Don't Have To Go
Leaving On A Jet Plane
Season 5 Episodes
Coming Home
Too Much Too Little Too Late
Lovin Livin And Givin
Ready Steady Go
Up Against The Wall
Wild Side Of Life
Take On That World
Is This A Love Thing
Name Of The Game
No More Tears
Both Ends Burning
Who What Where When Why
Crying, Laughing, Lying, Loving (100th Episode)
No One Is Innocent Part 1
No One Is Innocent Part 2
Carry On Wayward Son
All The World's A Stage
One Day At A Time
Love Games
Lies In Your Eyes
Can This Be Love
Code Of Love
Stay
Masquerade
From Me To You
After The Rain
Season 6 Episodes
Straight From The Heart
Love Is A Stranger
Best That You Can Do
Daddy's Home
Is There Something I Should Know?
Guilty
Do You Really Want To Hurt Me?
Love Will Tear Us Apart
We Have A Dream
Love On Your Side
Total Eclipse Of The Heart
I Could Be Happy
The Gift
Happy Birthday
Through The Years

Accolades

References

Singaporean television series
1996 Singaporean television series debuts
2001 Singaporean television series endings
Okto shows